Eupatorium anomalum, commonly called Florida thoroughwort, is a North American species in the family Asteraceae. It grows in the southeastern United States from Alabama to Virginia. Molecular investigations suggest that it originated as a hybrid between  E. serotinum and E. mohrii but it is well-established on its own as a distinct species.

Eupatorium anomalum is a tall perennial sometimes over 150 cm (5 feet) tall, producing tuberous rhizomes. It has opposite, egg -shaped leaves, and flat-topped arrays of a large number of tiny flower heads. Each head has 5 white disc florets but no ray florets.

References

anomalum
Flora of the Southeastern United States
Plants described in 1896
Flora without expected TNC conservation status